Michael Colin Fox (born 5 January 1989) is an English actor who is best known for playing Andrew Parker in the fifth and sixth seasons of the television series Downton Abbey (2014–2015).

Personal life
Fox was born in High Wycombe, Buckinghamshire, England. He resides in London. He is also a musician and is in a band called Luna.

Fox has been in a relationship with his Downton Abbey co-star Laura Carmichael since 2014. They have a son together.

Education
He went to John Hampden Grammar School in High Wycombe. He was rejected from drama school twice and then completed his education at the Royal Central School of Speech and Drama in London, graduating in 2013 according to IMDb. Later on, being recognised as a successful actor, he supposedly acted in one their promotional videos.

Filmography

Film

Television

References

External links
Michael Fox at IMDb

1989 births
British male television actors
Living people
People educated at John Hampden Grammar School
British male film actors
Male actors from Buckinghamshire
People from High Wycombe
Alumni of the Royal Central School of Speech and Drama
21st-century English male actors